Stara Huta  
(Cashubian Stôrô Hëta) is a village in the administrative district of Gmina Kartuzy, within Kartuzy County, Pomeranian Voivodeship, in northern Poland.

For details of the history of the region, see History of Pomerania.

The village has a population of 243.

References

Stara Huta